State Route 82 (SR 82) is a  arc-shaped state highway in the Piedmont region in the U.S. state of Georgia. The highway connects Winder to a point east of Gainesville, via Arcade and Jefferson.

Route description

Barrow County
SR 82 begins at an intersection with SR 11/SR 53/SR 211 in Winder. The route heads east from Winder to a second intersection with SR 211, northeast of Statham. Just east of that intersection, SR 82 intersects SR 330. A little ways to the northeast, the route enters Jackson County.

Jackson and Hall Counties

In the city of Arcade, SR 82 intersects US 129/SR 11 Conn. Just to the northeast, the highway intersects US 129 Bus./SR 15 Alt. The three highways begin a concurrency northwest to Jefferson. In the city, they intersect SR 11 Bus. SR 11 Bus. joins the concurrency for just two blocks. At this intersection, US 129 Bus./SR 11 Bus. depart to the northwest, while SR 15 Alt./SR 82 travel to the northeast. Just before leaving the city, the two routes split, with SR 82 heading to the north. Northwest of Jackson County Airport, the route intersects SR 82 Conn. Farther to the northwest, Interstate 85 (I-85) crosses the path.

Northwest of the interchange with I-85, the route enters Hall County, where it meets its northern terminus at SR 323 east of Gainesville, near Tadmore Elementary School.

History

Major intersections

Bannered route

State Route 82 Connector (SR 82 Conn.) is a  connector route for SR 82 that connects rural portions of Jackson County with the southern part of Maysville.

It begins at an intersection with the SR 82 mainline (Dry Pond Road) northwest of Apple Valley. It travels to the northeast and curves to the north-northwest. It travels on an overpass over Interstate 85 (I-85), but without access to that freeway. The highway curves to the north-northeast. It meets the southern entrance to Hurricane Shoals Park just before crossing over the North Oconee River. It begins to curve back to the north-northwest; on this curve is the northern entrance to the park. It begins a curve to the north-northeast; on this curve, it enters the city limits of Maysville. It passes Maysville Elementary School

See also

References

082
Transportation in Barrow County, Georgia
Transportation in Jackson County, Georgia
Transportation in Hall County, Georgia